Saadet II Giray (reigned 1584) was nominally a khan of the Crimean Khanate. More accurately, he rebelled against his uncle and called himself khan, but was soon driven out.

He was the son of Mehmed II Giray. When the Turks replaced Mehmed with Islyam II, Mehmed fled but was caught and killed. His sons reached safety on the steppes. Less than three months later Saadet returned with an army. Saadet took the capital and had the nobles name him khan. Islyam appealed to the Turks who sent troops and drove Saadet out of Crimea. He died at Astrakhan around 1588, possibly murdered by the Russians.

For a fuller account see his father Mehmed II Giray and his adversary Islyam II Giray.

His sons
Kumyk: Probably poisoned by Russians in Astrakhan along with his uncle Murad
Devlet: Nureddin under Gazi II; in 1601 planned to rebel but was killed. 
Shahin Giray: Escaped after Devlet was killed, active until 1641. 
Mehmed III Giray: Escaped after Devlet was killed, killed Tokhtamysh, later khan.

References
Oleksa Gaivoronsky «Повелители двух материков», Kiev-Bakhchisarai, second edition, 2010, volume 1, pages 320–322 (revolt), page 329 (death)
Henry Hoyle Howorth, History of the Mongols, 1880, Part 2, pp. 519–520 (short account)

Crimean Khans